Diocese of Vladimir may refer to the following ecclesiastical jurisdictions in Eastern Europe :

 Russian Orthodox Eparchy of Vladimir
 the former Roman Catholic Diocese of Vladimir (Lodomeria)